Ideal womanhood, perfect womanhood, perfect woman and ideal woman are terms or labels to apply to subjective statements or thoughts on idealised female traits.

The concept of the "ideal woman"
The term is applied in the context of various times and cultures, for example:
Fatimah, daughter of Muhammad and wife of Imam Ali, seen as the pinnacle of female virtues and the ideal role model for the entirety of women.
Sita as the ideal Hindu or Indian woman
 Penelope, wife of Odysseus in the Odyssey, described as the ideal woman of ancient Greek society, "the embodiment of chastity, generosity, cunning, and intelligence"
 Queen Victoria as the ideal Victorian era woman
 Proverbs 31 woman: "wife of noble character", as described in the Old Testament book of Proverbs, skilled in both household management and trade
 Mary, mother of Jesus as an ideal of both virgin and mother - a concept with some pervasiveness in Latin America (see Marianismo).
 the "ideal woman" stereotype of the 1950s, described by Betty Friedan in The Feminine Mystique as defined by "sexual passivity, male domination, and nurturing maternal love"
 Yamato nadeshiko in pre-modern Japan.

Examples
A great deal of writing has been done on the subject. The subject of the Ideal Woman has been treated humorously, theologically, and musically.

Examples of "ideal women" are portrayed in literature, for example:
 Sophie, a character in Jean-Jacques Rousseau's Emile: or, On Education (book V) who is raised to be the perfect wife. 
 Lucretia as depicted by Benjamin Britten in The Rape of Lucretia.
 Sylvia, in William Shakespeare's poem Who is Sylvia?

Many books have been written on the subject of the Ideal Woman.

See also
 Femininity
 The Angel in the House
 Cult of Domesticity
 Good Wife, Wise Mother
 Manic Pixie Dream Girl
 María Clara
 Mary Sue
 Yamato nadeshiko

References

External links
True Womanhood - a presentation - College of Staten Island Library

Women by role